The South Western Districts women's cricket team is the women's representative cricket team for part of the South African province of Western Cape. They compete in the Women's Provincial Programme and the CSA Women's Provincial T20 Competition.

History
South Western Districts Women joined the South African domestic system ahead of the 2005–06 season, playing in the Women's Provincial League, in which they finished 6th in their group of 7 with one win from their twelve matches. They have competed in the tournament ever since, but have never reached the knockout stages. In the 2008–09 season, they won the B Section Group, but lost the promotion/relegation play-off to Eastern Province. In 2021–22, the side topped Pool A before beating Free State in a play-off to gain promotion to the Top 6 for the first time.

They have also competed in the CSA Women's Provincial T20 Competition since its inception in 2012–13, but again have never made it to the knockout rounds.

Players

Current squad
Based on squad announced for the 2021–22 season. Players in bold have international caps.

Notable players
Players who have played for South Western Districts and played internationally are listed below, in order of first international appearance (given in brackets):

  Rebecca Grundy (2014)
  Bernadine Bezuidenhout (2014)
  Annerie Dercksen (2023)

See also
 South Western Districts (cricket team)

Notes

References

Women's cricket teams in South Africa
Cricket in the Western Cape